Nick Gillard is an English stuntman and stunt coordinator. He is best known as the lead lightsaber fight and stunt coordinator of the Star Wars prequel trilogy films (1999–2005).

Biography
Gillard was born in Brighton, England. At the age of twelve, he ran away from military school to join the circus where he performed as bareback horse rider. Over the next few years Gillard worked with several circus's including Circus Althoff in Germany and Los Muchachos Circus in Spain. Gillard was invited to do stunts on The Thief of Baghdad. He enjoyed it, and later left the circus to perform stunt work in films, including the original Star Wars. Gillard was Mark Hamill's first choice as his stunt double for Return of the Jedi.

As a stuntman, Gillard held the world record for longest fire stunt, with a fire burn without air for over two minutes on Alien 3. He also performed a 200-foot power boat jump over two bridges in the film Amsterdamned, and was set on fire over 100 times.

Among Gillard's movie credits are Sleepy Hollow, Robin Hood: Prince of Thieves, Raiders of the Lost Ark and Indiana Jones and the Last Crusade. Gillard was the fight choreographer of the Star Wars prequels. He had a cameo appearance in Star Wars: Episode III – Revenge of the Sith as Cin Drallig ("Nic Gillard" spelled backwards). His likeness was used for the character with a larger role in the accompanying video game, for which Gillard choreographed the combat animations.

Filmography

As stunt coordinator, arranger or performer

Film

 1977 The Spy Who Loved Me
 1981 For Your Eyes Only
 1983 Krull
 1984 Scream for Help
 1985 Restless Natives
 1985 The Bride
 1985 Legend
 1985 Murder Elite
 1985 Claudia
 1985 Christmas Present
 1986 Labyrinth
 1986 Aliens
 1987 The Living Daylights
 1987 Empire of the Sun
 1988 Amsterdamned
 1988 Willow
 1988 Dream Demon
 1988 The Beast of War
 1989 Indiana Jones and the Last Crusade
 1989 Henry V
 1990 1871
 1990 Frankenstein Unbound
 1990 Bullseye!
 1991 Young Soul Rebels
 1991 Robin Hood: Prince of Thieves
 1991 Company Business
 1991 Under Suspicion
 1992 Far and Away
 1992 Alien³
 1992 Double X: The Name of the Game
 1992 1492: Conquest of Paradise
 1993 Son of the Pink Panther
 1993 The Three Musketeers
 1994 Being Human
 1994 Black Beauty
 1994 Interview with the Vampire
 1995 Rob Roy
 1995 Judge Dredd
 1995 Waterworld
 1995 Nothing Personal
 1995 GoldenEye
 1995 The Darkening
 1996 Twelfth Night: Or What You Will
 1996 The Wind in the Willows
 1997 Seven Years in Tibet
 1997 Tomorrow Never Dies
 1999 Plunkett & Macleane
 1999 Notting Hill
 1999 Star Wars: Episode I – The Phantom Menace (Also swordmaster)
 1999 Sleepy Hollow
 2000 Shaft (Also second unit director)
 2001 Buffalo Soldiers
 2002 Star Wars: Episode II – Attack of the Clones (Also swordmaster)
 2002 Reign of Fire (Also second unit director)
 2002 Dirty Pretty Things
 2005 Star Wars: Episode III – Revenge of the Sith (Also swordmaster)
 2008 Wanted
 2010 Tamara Drewe
 2013 The Fold
 2015 The Hippopotamus

Television

 1983 Owain Glendower, Prince of Wales
 1983 A Pattern of Roses
 1985 Lace II
 1987 Screen Two
 1987 Floodtide
 1987 Way Upstream
 1988 The One Game
 1989–1990 Poirot
 1989–1990 Boon
 1989–2010 The Bill
 1991 Duel of Hearts
 1992 Forever Green
 1992 Taggart
 1993 Lovejoy
 1993 Between the Lines
 1994 Wild Justice
 1994–1995 The Tomorrow People
 1995 Pie in the Sky
 1996 Broken Glass
 1997–1999 Red Dwarf
 2000 The Adventures of Young Indiana Jones: My First Adventure
 2005 Colditz
 2009 Minder
 2010 Identity
 2010 Spooks
 2013 Burton & Taylor
 2014 Da Vinci's Demons (Season 3) (Also swordmaster)
 2015 Jekyll & Hyde
 2015 And Then There Were None
 2015 Undercover
 2016 Guilt
 2016 Black Mirror
 2016 Rillington Place
 2016 The White Princess (Also swordmaster)
 2016 The Domestics
 2017 The Brave
 2017 The Miniaturist
 2018 The Alienist
 2018 Kiss Me First
 2018 Dark Heart

Video games
 2005 Star Wars: Episode III – Revenge of the Sith (Also likeness as Cin Drallig)

As actor

Film
 1981: Raiders of the Lost Ark – German Soldier (uncredited)
 1989: Indiana Jones and the Last Crusade – Periscope Soldier (uncredited)
 1990: King of the Wind – First Sailor
 1990: Frankenstein Unbound – Man No. 2/Man No. 3
 2003: Cheeky – Taxi Driver
 2005: Star Wars: Episode III – Revenge of the Sith – Cin Drallig
 2014: Vampire Academy – Kenneth (uncredited)

Television
 1979: Premiere – Angel
 1982: The Jim Davidson Show
 1985: Mr. Palfrey of Westminster – Alec Thompson
 1989: Ticket to Ride – Brother Paul
 1989: Streetwise – Heavy
 1990: EastEnders – Restaurant Manager
 1990: TECX – Luke/Luc
 1991: Bottom
 1994: Minder – Queen

References

External links
 
 Gillard's personal website
 Gillard's YouTube channel

1959 births
Living people
People from Brighton
English choreographers
Film choreographers
English stunt performers
English male film actors
English male television actors
English film directors